{{Infobox sportsperson
| name = Mark Felix
| nickname = 
| image = Mark Felix.jpg
| caption = 
| birth_date = 
| birth_place = St. George's, Grenada
| residence = Rishton, Lancashire, England
| education = 
| height = 
| weight = 
| sport = Strongman
| medaltemplates = 

 

{{CompetitionRecord|1st| 2016 WSF World Cup'| }}

 

}}Mark Felix (born 17 April 1966) is a Grenadian-English strongman competitor and regular entrant to the World's Strongest Man competition. He has competed at a record 17 World's Strongest Man contests, reaching the finals three times. He is the winner of the 2015 Ultimate Strongman Masters World Championships, 2016 WSF World Cup India and has won numerous international grip contests, including the Rolling Thunder World Championships in 2008 and 2009, as well as the Vice Grip Viking Challenge in 2011 and 2012. Having competed in over 100 international competitions throughout 19 years, Felix is the 3rd most prolific strongman contestant in history.

Early life
Mark Felix  was born in 1966 in St. George's, Grenada. At the age of 23, he moved to Great Harwood, Lancashire, England. He was a dedicated bodybuilder and turned his attention to strongman competitions in 2003 at the age of 37, comparatively late in relation to other strength athletes.

Strongman career
Felix turned pro as a strongman within a year when the IFSA Strongman Federation was launched in 2004.

Felix came third in England's Strongest Man in 2004, and in 2005 he went on to come second to Eddy Elwood in the IFSA version of England's Strongest Man. This led him to the IFSA British Championships which he won in 2005. Of the five events, Felix won three (Deadlift, Farmer's Walk and Atlas Stones). Afterwards, Felix credited his victory to "Big hands, big heart".

In 2005, Felix was invited to compete in the IFSA World Open in Sao Paulo, Brazil which was a qualifier for the 2005 IFSA Strongman World Championships later in the year, but he failed to finish in the top four and did not qualify for the IFSA World Championships.

Felix also competed in the IFSA World Team Championships in 2005 as a part of Team World' representing Grenada, the team placed third overall.

In 2006, Felix placed second in the Britain's Strongest Man competition and this led to a place in the 2006 World's Strongest Man in which he placed fourth in the finals. In 2007, he repeated his second-place finish in Britain's Strongest Man and finished seventh in the 2007 World's Strongest Man. In the same year, he also finished third in the Strongman Super Series 2007 Mohegan Sun Grand Prix.

In 2008, he came fourth in Europe's Strongest Man and went on to finish third in Britain's Strongest Man, qualifying him for a third successive WSM appearance. Felix has said, "Every year I gain more experience and learn more about what I am capable of."In 2017, Felix underwent an operation for a torn bicep.

Rolling Thunder/Grip
Felix won the inaugural 2008 Rolling Thunder World Championships which took place during the 2008 Fortissimus contest in Canada. He also set a new world record with a lift of 301 lb.

In June 2009, Felix successfully defended his Rolling Thunder World Championships title.

Felix won the inaugural 2011 Vice Grip Viking Challenge which took place on 29–30 January at the LA Fitexpo.

Felix retained his Vice Grip title by winning the 2012 Vice Grip Viking Challenge, he also set a world record in the Captains of Crush "COC" Silver Bullet event (holding a suspended weight from within the handles of a Captains of Crush no. 3 gripper) with a time of 43.25 seconds.

Felix set a new world record in the Hercules Hold event at Giants live Manchester 2019 with a time of 87.52 seconds.

Felix set a new world record in the Dinnie Stone hold, at the 2020 Arnold Strongman Classic with a time of 31.40 seconds.

Personal recordsdone in the gym Squat – 
 Bench press – 
 Deadlift (without wrist straps) – done in competition Equipped Deadlift – 420kg

Strongmandone in official Strongman competition''
 Hummer Tire Deadlift (with straps) –  (Arnold Strongman Classic 2013)
 Hercules Hold – 92.37 seconds (World Record, Europe's Strongest Man 2020)
 Silver Dollar Deadlift (no deadlift suit) –  (UK's Strongest Man 2021)

References

1966 births
English strength athletes
Grenadian strength athletes
English sportsmen
Grenadian sportsmen
People from Great Harwood
Living people
Grenadian emigrants to England
Grenadian male athletes